"You Broke Me First" (often stylized in all lowercase) is a song by Canadian singer Tate McRae. It was released on April 17, 2020, through RCA Records as the lead single from her second extended play, Too Young to Be Sad (2021). The song gained popularity on the video-sharing platform TikTok, where it has featured in over a million videos. The song is the second most streamed song released by a female artist in 2020. The song impacted mainstream US radio on August 4, 2020.

"You Broke Me First" peaked at number eight on the Canadian Hot 100. Outside of Canada, "You Broke Me First" peaked within the top ten of the charts in Australia, Belgium (Flanders), Finland, Ireland, Malaysia, the Netherlands, Norway, Singapore, Sweden, and the United Kingdom.

Composition and lyrics 
"You Broke Me First" is a pop song. McRae recalls her lyric "But I don't really care how bad it hurts, cause you broke me first" being praised by songwriter Victoria Zaro and producer Blake Harnage while in the studio. She says that writing and recording the song was a "super quick process". Through the song, McRae expresses that she refuses to feel sympathetic for an ex-partner. She told Anna Rose of NME,

McRae also revealed to Hollywood Life that the song is lyrically connected to its single successor, "Vicious". This song is written in the key of C# Minor.

Reception 
”You Broke Me First” received critical acclaim from critics, who praised McRae's vocal performance, the production and honest lyricism. Multiple critics wrote that the song was McRae's most personal to date, with some describing it as a "hard-hitting ballad". McRae reacted to the acclaim from fans and critics, saying she was "super happy that other people are connecting with the song too."

Commercial performance 
In the United Kingdom, "You Broke Me First" debuted at number 66 on the UK Singles Chart and later climbed to number five on the chart, becoming McRae's first top ten entry in Britain. The song later peaked at number three on the chart. 

In the Republic of Ireland, the song entered the Irish Singles Chart three weeks before and eventually rose to number nine, becoming the first top ten peak in her career. The song later peaked at number three on the chart. 

In New Zealand, the song entered at number 18 on the Hot Singles Chart upon its initial release, before debuting at number 34 on the New Zealand Singles Chart several weeks later amid its popularization. It peaked at number 12 on the chart.

In the United States, the song would also become her first chart entry on the Billboard Hot 100, peaking at number 17. When it reached number 40 in its 20th week, the song attained the third-slowest climb to the top 40 by a female artist, after Norah Jones's "Don't Know Why" and KT Tunstall's "Suddenly I See". The track peaked at number 2 on the Mainstream Top 40 chart and number 1 on the US Mediabase top 40 chart, becoming her first number one single and breaking the record for the longest climb to number 1 by a female solo artist at 28 weeks on the latter chart. "You Broke Me First" is also the longest-charting song released by a female artist in 2020 on the Billboard Hot 100, at 38 weeks.

Live performances 
McRae performed the song at the 2020 MTV Video Music Awards. In October, she performed the song on Jimmy Kimmel Live!. In November, McRae performed the song at the 2020 MTV Europe Music Awards and was praised by NME and Billboard for being one of the stand out performers. In January 2021, she performed the song on The Tonight Show Starring Jimmy Fallon.

Personnel 
Credits adapted from Tidal:

 Blake Harnage – producer, composer, lyricist, recording engineer
 Tate McRae – composer, lyricist
 Victoria Zaro – composer, lyricist
 Dave Kutch – mastering engineer
 Jeff Juliano – mixing engineer

Charts

Weekly charts

Year-end charts

Certifications

Release history

References

2020 singles
2020 songs
2020s ballads
Pop ballads
RCA Records singles
Songs written by Tate McRae
Tate McRae songs